Dimitrios P. Kontoyiannis is the Robert C Hickey Chair in Clinical Care and Deputy Head for Research in the Division of Internal Medicine at The University of Texas MD Anderson Cancer Center in Houston, Texas. He received his medical degree as valedictorian Summa Cum Laude from the National and Kapodistrian University of Athens, Greece. Kontoyiannis was trained in Internal Medicine at Baylor College of Medicine in Houston, where he served as a Chief Medical Resident. He was subsequently trained as a clinical fellow in Infectious Diseases at Massachusetts General Hospital and obtained a master's degree in Clinical Sciences from Harvard Medical School in Boston. He spent three years at the Whitehead Institute for Biomedical Sciences/Massachusetts Institute of Technology as a fellow in the Harvard MIT Clinical Investigators Training Program.

Kontoyiannis is considered among the one or two leading experts in mycology worldwide and among the first or second most highly cited investigators in the area of mycology with over 650 peer-reviewed publications and 62484 citations. and an H index of 122 He is the recipient of many institutional, national, and international awards such as the 2004 American Society for Microbiology Award for Outstanding Research in the Pathogenesis of Microbial Diseases (mentor), The Billy Cooper Memorial award from The Medical Mycology Society of the Americas (MMSA, 2013), The Drouhet Medal from the European Confederation of Medical Mycology (ECMM, 2015), Littman award from the Mycology Society of NY (2016), emeritus member of Paul-Ehrlich-Society (2016).

Kontoyiannis is a fellow of the American College of Physicians, Infectious Diseases Society of America, American Academy of Microbiology, European Society of Clinical Microbiology and Infectious Diseases (ESCMID), a fellow in Royal College of Physicians, and an inaugural lifetime fellow of the ECMM. Kontoyiannis is the past president-elect of Immunocompromised Host Society (2016-2018) Kontoyiannis is also a fellow of the American Association for the Advancement of Science and he is the recipient of Award for Excellence in Clinical Microbiology and Infectious Diseases of the European Society of Clinical Microbiology and Infectious Diseases for 2018. In 2018 he was recently elected as a member in class II–Medicine of the European Academy of Sciences and Arts (Academia Scientiarium et Artium Europaea). He is the 2019 recipient of the Rhoda Benham Award in MMSA. Kontoyiannis is listed in the 1% of the most highly cited and influential researchers in the world.  He is the leader of the ECMM Diamond Excellence in Mycology Center at MD Anderson Cancer Center, the only US center to receive such designation by ECMM. He is the president elect of The Mycoses Study Group Education Consortium (2024-26).

References 

University of Texas faculty
American infectious disease physicians
Living people
National and Kapodistrian University of Athens alumni
Greek microbiologists
Harvard Medical School alumni
1963 births
People from Athens
Fellows of the Infectious Diseases Society of America